This List of banks that have merged to form the State Bank of India includes financial institutions that were at one point or the other merged with the State Bank of India or any of its subsidiaries.

This list includes the banks which have been subsidiaries or associates of the State Bank of India. Many of these subsidiaries were later merged into the main State Bank of India.

List of banks that have merged to form the State Bank of India

See also
 History of banking
 Banking in India
 List of oldest companies
 List of oldest companies in India
 Lindy effect

References

External links 
 List maintained by the Reserve Bank of India
 Evolution of Banking in India
 Charles Northcote Cooke
 History of Banking in India

Economy-related lists of superlatives
Lists of banks
History of banking
Banks
Lists of companies of India
Lists of longest-duration things
Banks of India
State Bank of India